In Abstraction is the 4th studio album by the American band A Hope for Home. It was released on December 6, 2011, through Facedown Records.

Track listing

Personnel
A Hope for Home
 Nathan Winchell – vocals
 Matthew Ellis – guitar, vocals
 Tanner Morita – guitar
 Dan McCall – bass
 Lance Taylor – drums
 Eric Gerrard - keyboard, programming

References

2011 albums
A Hope for Home albums
Facedown Records albums